William Wiseman (18 October 1896 – 1981) was a Scottish amateur footballer who played as a left back in the Scottish League for Queen's Park and later served on the club's committee. He was capped by Scotland at amateur and full international levels.

Personal life 
Wiseman was educated at Fordyce Academy, Portsoy and Aberdeen University and left the latter institution in 1916 to serve in the First World War with the Gordon Highlanders. During his time on the Western Front, he was gassed, wounded and posted missing for a week. He rose to the rank of captain and also served as a lieutenant in the Tank Corps. After the war, he went to India to assist with the restructuring of the British Indian Army.

After leaving the army, Wiseman completed his studies at Glasgow Technical College and later worked as an Assistant Roads Surveyor for Dunbartonshire Council. He took up a Deputy County Surveyor position in Banffshire in 1930, bringing his senior football days to an end – his place in the Queen's Park team was taken by Herbert Dickson who held the position for the next decade. Wiseman also married in 1930 and had one son. He served as a major in the Royal Engineers during the Second World War, recruiting and training personnel in Scotland and then working on infrastructure projects.

Honours 
Queen's Park
Scottish League Division Two: 1922–23

See also
List of solved missing person cases

References

Sources

External links

London Hearts profile (Scotland)
London Hearts profile (Scottish League)

1896 births
1981 deaths
Alumni of the University of Aberdeen
Association football fullbacks
Scottish footballers
Scottish Football League players
British Army personnel of World War I
Queen's Park F.C. players
People educated at Fordyce Academy
Footballers from Aberdeenshire
Scotland amateur international footballers
British Army personnel of World War II
Scotland international footballers
Gordon Highlanders officers
Royal Tank Regiment officers
Missing in action of World War I
Royal Engineers officers
Formerly missing people